The Austrian Basketball Supercup  is a yearly held basketball game that is a super cup competition. It is played by the Austrian champion and the Austrian Cup winner. The game was introduced in 2002, and the first two editions were won by Kapfenberg Bulls.

Editions

Performances by club
Teams in italic are nog longer existing.

References
'''General

Supercup
Basketball supercup competitions in Europe